Vladislav Bobrik (born 6 January 1971 in Novosibirsk) is a Russian former road bicycle racer.

Major results

1990
1st, Stage 3, Tour de Trump
1991
1st, Stage 3, Redlands Classic
1994
1st, Giro di Lombardia
1st, Stage 1, Vuelta a Aragón
1995
1st, Stage 8b, Paris–Nice

External links

1971 births
Russian male cyclists
Living people
Sportspeople from Novosibirsk